Shirma Rouse is a Dutch singer, who was a participant in The Voice of Holland, was named best backing singer in the Eurovision Song Contest by The Eurovision Times in 2013 and was invited to the funeral of Aretha Franklin due to the popularity of her tribute album to the artist.

Biography 
Rouse born in Curaçao, but grew up on Sint Eustatius. At the age of nineteen she moved to Rotterdam to pursue a degree in Chemistry; however she joined a choir and transferred to a degree programme in Jazz Vocals. In 2010 Rouse released an album of soul music called Chocolate Coated Dreams. In 2012, a second CD was released, Shirma Rouse sings Aretha, with which she did a theatre tour.

In 2013, she accompanied Anouk to the Eurovision Song Contest in Malmö as a backing singer, where she was named best backing singer by The Eurovision Times. That same year, Rouse participated in The Voice of Holland.

In 2017, Rouse toured with The Soul of Spanish Harlem; in addition, she resumed her Aretha Franklin tribute. After the death of Franklin in 2018, Rouse was invited to attend the funeral. Novelist Herman Brusselsmans, in his 2021 work, described the fatphobic comments that he subjected Rouse to, and the public backlash he received as a result.

In 2021 she published a cookery book in Dutch entitled Shirma's Soul Kitchen.

Discography

Albums 

 Chocolate Coated Dreams (Coast to Coast, 2010)
 Sings Aretha (Stemra, 2012)
 Dedicated to You (Challenge Records, 2012)
 Shout It Out Loud (Play It Again Sam, 2014)

References 

Living people
Year of birth missing (living people)
Sint Eustatius people
Dutch women singers
Dutch gospel singers
People from Rotterdam